Alf Daniel Moen (born 2 February 1950) is a Norwegian forester and politician for the Labour Party. He lives in Hegra and was mayor of Stjørdal from 1986 to 1994 and from 1995 to 1999. Moen has been leader of the county cabinet of Nord-Trøndelag county municipality since 2003, and was reelected in 2007. He took over as the political leader of the Landsdelsutvalget (Regional Council) in 2009.

References

1950 births
Living people
People from Stjørdal
Labour Party (Norway) politicians
Mayors of places in Nord-Trøndelag